Le Mur is a contemporary urban art spot in rue Oberkampf (11eme arrondissement) in Paris, France. 

It is the initial spot of the street art movement in Paris in April 2000. Le Mur was at this time an advertising billboard was firstly hijacked by artist Hephaestus in spring 2000.

In 2007 it became an officially sanctioned street exhibition space.

Further reading 
Thomas Schmitt, Une Nuit,  Kitchen 93, 2005,  
Jean Faucheur, Thomas Schmitt, Le Mur /The Wall, Kitchen 93, 2010, 
Tristan Manco, Street Logos, Thames & Hudson, 2004,  
Patrick Nguyen & Stuart Mackenzie, Beyond the Street: The 100 Leading Figures in Urban Art, Die Gestalten Verlag, 2010. ,  (p. 185)

References and notes

External links 
a review on paris.untappedcities.com
official flash site

Culture of Paris